Magnolia Award for Best Supporting Actor is awarded under the Shanghai Television Festival.

References

Shanghai Television Festival